Wawa Lake is a lake located in northeastern Ontario, Canada in the Algoma District, near the town of Wawa.

See also
List of lakes in Ontario

Lakes of Algoma District